Walter Serena (3 April 1928 – 19 August 2011) was an Italian cyclist, who competed as a professional from 1952 to 1957. He most notably won the 1954 Volta a Catalunya. He also competed in five editions of the Giro d'Italia.

Major results

1953
 6th Züri-Metzgete
 9th Giro dell'Appennino
1954
 1st  Overall Volta a Catalunya
1st Stage 8 (ITT)
 6th Coppa Sabatini
 6th Giro del Veneto
 7th Giro di Campania
 8th Giro di Lombardia
 10th Overall Tour de Suisse
1955
 3rd Giro del Veneto
 8th Overall Volta a Catalunya
 9th Giro di Lombardia
1956
 1st Stage 2b (TTT) Giro d'Italia
 3rd Overall Giro di Sicilia
 8th Overall Volta a Catalunya

References

External links
 

1928 births
2011 deaths
Italian male cyclists
Cyclists from the Province of Brescia